Service numbers were used by the United States Army from 1918 until 1969.  Prior to this time, the Army relied on muster rolls as a means of indexing enlisted service members while officers were usually listed on yearly rolls maintained by the United States War Department.  In the nineteenth century, the Army also used pay records as a primary means of identifying service members after discharge.

World War I

Service numbers (SNs) were first created in 1918 as a result of the United States Army becoming involved in World War I and the need for a record tracking system capable of indexing the millions of soldiers who were joining the ranks of the National Army.  Prior to this time, the only way to index lists of soldiers was by use of rosters and muster rolls.  As the strength of the  National Army rose into the millions, this old method of musters and rosters became outdated and a new system had to be developed.

The decision to create Army service numbers was made in February 1918 with the first service numbers to be issued only to Army enlisted personnel; the Army officer corps was still relatively small, and the Navy was still maintaining ship rosters to keep track of its personnel.  The Marine Corps and Coast Guard were also relatively small organizations without the need for a service number system to track personnel.

The first soldier to receive an Army service number during the First World War was Master Sergeant Arthur Crean who was designated to hold service number 1 in the National Army in February 1918.  Throughout the remainder of World War I, service numbers were issued to most enlisted personnel with the numbers eventually ranging from 1 to 5 999 999.

In 1920, a year after the close of World War I, the Army introduced the first "service number prefix" which was intended to be a letter placed in front of the service number to provide additional information about the veteran.  The first prefix to be created was R which was used to identify Regular Army personnel who had re-enlisted after the close of World War I and the disbandment of the National Army.  Again, Arthur Crean was the first person to receive a service number prefix, and his new service number became R-1.  The Army also created an F prefix for those who had served as World War I field clerks.

That same year, the Army opened up the service number rolls to officers and issued the first officer number to John J. Pershing.  Pershing held officer service number 1 with the prefix O, making his service number O-1.  In 1935, the Army created a second officer prefix, AO, intended for Regular Army officers who were aviators in the Army Air Corps.

The Army officer number system was determined simply by seniority and entry date into the Army officer corps; between 1921 and 1935, officer numbers ranged from 1 to 19 999.  Enlisted service numbers continued in a similar fashion with enlisted numbers picking up where the World War I numbers had left off; between 1919 and 1940 the numbers ranged from 6 000 000 to 7 099 999.  Enlisted personnel who were World War I veterans continued to hold their pre-6 million series service numbers.

World War II

By 1940, it was obvious to most in the U.S. military establishment that America would soon be involved in a major war.  To that end, conscription had been introduced and the Army of the United States was activated as an augmentation force to serve in the coming war.

Due to the vast numbers of personnel entering the Army ranks, a major expansion to the service number system was required.  The original concept was to simply continue with the old service number system and begin with new numbers starting at 8 000 000.  The Army, however, chose a more complicated design with new numbers beginning at 10 000 000.  The eight and nine million series were reserved for special uses; eight million series service numbers would later be used strictly by female Army personnel, while the nine million series service numbers were never issued.

Enlisted men

Wartime service numbers of the Regular Army and the Army of the United States began at 10 000 000 and extended to 19 999 999.  A subset of this series was reserved solely for those who had enlisted from recruiting stations outside of the 48 contiguous states of the United States.  The first number after the "ten" would indicate the geographical region from which a person had enlisted with the remaining numbers an identification number for the soldier.  The geographical codes were 10 1 (for Hawaii), 10 2 (for Panama), 10 3 (for the Philippines) and 10 4 (for Puerto Rico).  The remaining number codes (5, 6, 7, 8, 9, and 0) were unassigned and used by various recruiting stations outside the United States.

The 11 000 000 through 19 999 999 series were issued to enlisted personnel who had enlisted within the boundaries of the 48 contiguous states and the territory of Alaska after 1 July 1940.  The second number was determined by what group of states a person was recruited from, the next six were an identifying number for the service member; thus, for each geographical area there was an available range of 999,999 service numbers.  The various geographical number codes were as follows:

11: Connecticut, Maine, Massachusetts, New Hampshire, Rhode Island, Vermont

12: Delaware, New Jersey, New York

13: Maryland, Pennsylvania, Virginia, West Virginia, Washington, D.C.

14: Alabama, Florida, Georgia, Mississippi, North Carolina, South Carolina, Tennessee

15: Indiana, Kentucky, Ohio

16: Illinois, Michigan, Wisconsin

17: Colorado, Iowa, Kansas, Minnesota, Missouri, Nebraska, North Dakota, South Dakota, Wyoming

18: Arkansas, Louisiana, New Mexico, Oklahoma, Texas

19: Alaska, Arizona, California, Idaho, Montana, Nevada, Oregon, Utah, Washington

During World War II, the US Army federalized a large number of National Guard personnel to augment the growing Army of the United States.  Prior to 1940, there was no procedure to issue service numbers to National Guard personnel, since most personnel served completely under the authority of their state government.

Beginning in 1940, National Guardsmen who were federalized were given Army service numbers in the 20 million range with numbers ranging from 20 000 000 to 20 999 999.  Guardsmen federalized from Hawaii were issued service numbers beginning with 20 01 while 20 02 was used by men from Puerto Rico. With the exceptions of Hawaii and Puerto Rico, the first three numbers corresponded to a geographical area where a person had been federalized, and the last five were a personal identifier.  The geographical codes matched those of voluntary enlistees, and were as follows:

20 1: Connecticut, Maine, Massachusetts, New Hampshire, Rhode Island, Vermont

20 2: Delaware, New Jersey, New York

20 3: Maryland, Pennsylvania, Virginia, Washington, D.C.

20 4: Alabama, Florida, Georgia, Mississippi, North Carolina, South Carolina, Tennessee

20 5: Indiana, Kentucky, Ohio, West Virginia

20 6: Illinois, Michigan, Wisconsin

20 7: Colorado, Iowa, Kansas, Minnesota, Missouri, Nebraska, North Dakota, South Dakota, Wyoming

20 8: Arkansas, Louisiana, New Mexico, Oklahoma, Texas

20 9: Alaska, Arizona, California, Idaho, Montana, Nevada, Oregon, Utah, Washington

The conscripted force of the Army of the United States were issued service numbers in the 30 million range.  Service numbers ranged from 30 000 000 to 39 999 999.  As with Regular Army or Army of the United States voluntary enlistee service numbers, the second number corresponded to a geographical area where a person had been drafted and the last six were a personal identifier.  The geographical codes matched those of voluntary enlistees and National Guard personnel, and were as follows:

31: Connecticut, Maine, Massachusetts, New Hampshire, Rhode Island, Vermont

32: Delaware, New Jersey, New York

33: Maryland, Pennsylvania, Virginia, Washington, D.C.

34: Alabama, Florida, Georgia, Mississippi, North Carolina, South Carolina, Tennessee

35: Indiana, Kentucky, Ohio, West Virginia

36: Illinois, Michigan, Wisconsin

37: Colorado, Iowa, Kansas, Minnesota, Missouri, Nebraska, North Dakota, South Dakota, Wyoming

38: Arkansas, Louisiana, New Mexico, Oklahoma, Texas

39: Alaska, Arizona, California, Idaho, Montana, Nevada, Oregon, Utah, Washington

The 30 code was reserved for those who had been drafted from outside the United States with the third number following the "30" determining the extra-US draft location.  The extra-US draft codes which were established were 30 1 (Hawaii), 30 2 (Panama), 30 3 (the Philippines), and 30 4 (Puerto Rico).

In 1942, the Army expanded the enlisted conscript service numbers and created the forty million service number series (40 000 000 to 49 999 999).  These numbers were to be used for persons drafted from geographical areas that had exceeded their initially allotted 999,999 numbers.  In all, the only forty million series numbers that were ever issued ranged from 42 000 000 to 46 999 999.  The forty million series numbers were discontinued after World War II and never reused.

A final service number series of World War II was the ninety million series (90 000 000 to 99 999 999) which was reserved for members of the Philippine Army who had been called up to serve in the ranks of the U.S. Army.  These numbers were rarely issued and the ninety million series was permanently discontinued after World War II.

During World War II, the Army also expanded the service number prefixes to include several new one letter designators in addition the original three prefixes (R, F, and O) which had been created after World War I.  In all, the following prefixes were used during World War II.

A: Used by female members of the Women Army Corps

F: Used by field clerks during the First World War

K: Used by female reserve and specialist officers with service numbers 100 001 and higher

L: Used by enlisted members of the Women's Army Corps

N: Used by female nurse officers

O: Used by Regular Army officers

R: Used by Army enlisted personnel with service #s from 1 to 5 999 999 upon reenlistment

T: Used by flight officers appointed from an enlisted status

V: Used by officers of the Women Army Corps

W: Used by Regular Army Warrant Officers

Officers

Army officers continued to be assigned service numbers based on when they joined the officer corps with a service number range of 1 to 20 000.  In 1935, the Army extended the service numbers to 499 999 and, in 1942, officer service numbers were extended again to 3 000 000.

Officers of the Regular Army were assigned lower service numbers, with West Point graduates in the 1920s and 1930s receiving those in the 20 000 to 50 000 range.  The service numbers 800 000 through 999 999 were reserved for officers with special duties, while higher service numbers were held by officers of the Officers' Reserve Corps, graduates of officer candidate schools, or those who had been directly commissioned from the enlisted ranks.

By 1942, the Army had also discontinued the prefix O and established that all officer numbers would begin with a zero.  For instance, an officer with the service number O-2 345 678 would have the number written in military records as 02 345 678.

After the war

In October 1945, the Army discontinued the prefix "R" and issued the prefix "RA" to all members of the Regular Army.  At the same time, the Army added several other R series prefixes to deal with special enlisted situations.  In all, the R prefix series was:

RA: Regular Army enlisted personnel

RM: Regular Army enlisted personnel holding temporary appointments as Warrant Officers

RO: Used by Regular Army enlisted personnel holding temporary reserve officer commissions

RP: Retired enlisted personnel recalled to active duty

RV: Female warrant officers granted reserve commissioned officer billets

RW: Male warrant officers granted reserve commissioned officer billets

After World War II, the Army of the United States was demobilized and the thirty and forty million series numbers were discontinued.  Personnel of the Regular Army continued to be cycled through the 10 - 19 million series while Army officers continued to be issued numerical numbers determined by date of commission.  By the end of the 1940s, the 3,000,000 service number cap for officers had yet to be reached.

Korean War service numbers

At the end of the Second World War, the United States Army was reorganized into the following components:

 Regular Army: The voluntary force of the United States Army
 Army Reserve: The combined force formed from the older Enlisted and Officer Reserve Corps
 Army of the United States: The peacetime draft force
 Army National Guard: State military forces

Between 1945 and 1947, the World War II draft force was slowly disbanded with the 30 and 40 million service number series formally discontinued.  Personnel who chose to remain on active duty kept their original service numbers, regardless of their new component.  The United States Air Force was also founded in September 1947, with enlisted personnel transferring into the new organization with their old Army service numbers while officers were either issued a new number or kept their Army number as well.

In 1948, the Army opened up the 50 million service number series.  These numbers would range from 50 000 000 to 59 999 999 and would be assigned to personnel who were either drafted into the Army of the United States or who enlisted into the Army Reserve.  As with the older 30 million numbers, the first two numbers were determined by the geographical region from which a soldier was drafted or had enlisted.  Numbers beginning with "50" specified an entry location outside the United States with 050 0 reserved for Hawaii, 50 1 reserved for Panama and Puerto Rico, and 50 2 reserved for Alaska.  Within the United States, the geographical codes were:51: Connecticut, Delaware, Maine, Massachusetts, New Hampshire, New Jersey, New York, Rhode Island, Vermont
	52: Indiana, Kentucky, Maryland, Ohio, Pennsylvania, Virginia, West Virginia53: Alabama, Florida, Mississippi, North Carolina, South Carolina, Tennessee54: Arkansas, Louisiana, New Mexico, Oklahoma, Texas55: Colorado, Illinois, Iowa, Kansas, Michigan, Minnesota, Missouri, Nebraska, North Dakota, South Dakota, Wisconsin, Wyoming56: Arizona, California, Idaho, Georgia, Montana, Nevada, Oregon, Utah, Washington

Service numbers beginning with 57, 58, and 59 were not assigned a specific geographical region and were used for enlisted personnel in the Army Reserve or those assigned to special duties.  When the Korean War began in 1950, this service number system was used throughout the conflict and through the remainder of the 1950s.  The Regular Army service number system, ranging from 10 to 19 million, remained unchanged.

Officer service numbers during this period ranged from 50 000 to 500 000 (set aside for West Point graduates and Regular Army officers) and 500 001 to 3 000 000 used by reserve and direct appointment officers.  All officer service numbers by this point were preceded by a zero.

Vietnam era service numbers

In 1954, one year after the close of the Korean War, the Army extended the range of officer service numbers by adding the three and four million series. The new officer service numbers ranged from 1 000 000 to 4 999 999; service numbers from 800 000 to 999 999 were still being used for special duty officers. In 1957, officer numbers were extended again this time to 5 999 999.  It was also declared that the three million numbers (3 000 000 – 3 999 999) would only be issued to warrant officers. Service numbers below 500 000 were only issued to West Point graduates and other Regular Officers. By 1969, the highest service number issued to a West Point graduate was slightly above 120 000.

Enlisted service numbers during this post-Korea/pre-Vietnam era remained unchanged with the Regular Army continuing to cycle through the 10 - 19 million series while the draft force was assigned service numbers in the 50 to 59 million range. In 1966, with the increased US involvement of the Vietnam War, the Army realized that many more troops would be needed. The service number system had to be expanded, which resulted in the Army activating the 60 million enlisted service number series in 1967. Officer service numbers remained unchanged.

The new enlisted service numbers applied only to those drafted and ranged from 60 000 000 to 69 999 999 with the first two numbers a recruiting code and the last six a personal identifier.  At the same time, there were still a wide variety of older enlisted numbers still active, ranging back to the thirty million series used during World War II.

By 1968, the Army had also declared the final version of service number prefixes.  The most common prefixes were the following two letter codes:ER: Used by enlisted members of the Army ReserveFR: Used by some Army reservists from the late 1940s through 1962KF: Used by female Regular Army officersNG: Used by National Guard enlisted personnelOF: Used by male Regular Army officersUR: Used by draft personnel appointed as officers in the Regular ArmyUS: Used by conscripted enlisted personnel

The following special prefixes for medical personnel were also declared during the mid-1960s:MJ: Used by Occupational Therapist OfficersMM: Used by Physical Therapist OfficersMN: Used by male members of the Army Nurse CorpsMR: Used by Army enlisted dieticians

The Army also used the following one letter prefixes for a brief period of time in the 1960s:O: Used by some Army specialist officersR: Used by Army officer dieticians

From the late 1950s to the mid-1960s, the Army also had established the following special prefix codes for female personnel:WA: Used by enlisted members of the Women Army CorpsWL: Used by female Regular Army personnel granted officer commissions in the Army ReserveWM: Used by female Regular Army personnel granted warrant officer commissions in the Army ReserveWR: Used by female enlisted reservists attached to the Women Army Corps

The Regular Army prefix codes RA, RM, RO, RP, RV, and RW' remained unchanged from their post World War II origins.

Discontinuation of Army service numbers

In 1968, the Army activated the seventy million series and in 1969 created eighty million numbers as well.  The new numbers, which were to be issued only to the enlisted draft force, ranged from 70 000 000 to 89 999 999.  By this time, however, service numbers had been informally discontinued and most military records used Social Security numbers to identify the service member.  As a result, on July 1, 1969, service numbers were declared discontinued and no 70 or 80 million series numbers were ever issued.

It was not recorded who exactly held the last service number of the United States Army.  The highest service number for the draft force was in the 68 million range; however, since Social Security numbers were being commonly used instead of service numbers, the identity of the soldier who held this number is unknown.  The Regular Army, which had issued service numbers by geographical codes since World War II, had several numbers which could be interpreted as the final service number of the 10–19 million series.

The highest Army officer service numbers were issued slightly above 05 850 999 although there are no clear records of who held these final numbers, again due to Social Security numbers being used for record keeping instead of service numbers.  The last Regular Army service number was somewhere in the 130 000 to 140 000 range.

After 1969, the Army completely converted to Social Security numbers for the identification of military personnel.

Social Security Numbers Discontinued
In December 2015, a U.S. Army press release announced that the Army was phasing out the use of soldiers' Social Security numbers on their dog tags. Instead it would use the soldiers' Department of Defense Identification Numbers, which are randomly-generated 10-digit numbers. The change would not happen all at once; it was being implemented "on an as-needed basis."

Geographical Codes and Regular Army Distribution

State Geographical Codes were used as the first two numbers of an Army or Air Force enlisted service number to indicate where a soldier had entered the U.S. military.  For instance, the service number "12 345 678" would have a geographical code of 12 and a personal identification number of 345,678.  A comparison of the state codes between the Regular Army, World War II draft force, and Korea/Vietnam draft force is as follows:

In 1940, when the United States Army expanded its service numbers beyond ten million, the range of 10 000 000 to 10 999 999 was reserved for Regular Army enlisted personnel who joined from recruiting stations outside the United States.  With 999,999 service numbers available in this range, the Regular Army was able to issue service numbers to extra-US enlistees, without repeating numbers, until the disestablishment of service numbers in 1969.

The remaining range of 11 000 000 to 19 999 999 was reserved for Regular Army personnel who enlisted from within the United States with the first two numbers a geographical code and the last six a personal identifier.  This gave geographical recruiting areas 999,999 service numbers a piece to allocate to new recruits.  The Army directed that every effort should be made to avoid repeating service numbers and allocated only a certain block of numbers for certain time periods of enlistments.  The matter was made even more complicated when the Regular Air Force came into being in 1947, also with instructions that the 11–19 million service numbers should not be repeated nor should an Air Force service member be given a service numbers already held by a Regular Army soldier.

In general, both the Army and Air Force made every effort to avoid repeating service numbers although some mistakes did occur.  The final breakdown of Regular Army service numbers by time period was as follows:

Draft force service numbers in the 30 and 50 million range also used geographical codes but were free to use all 999,999 possible personal identification numbers for the entire period of the draft.  The 30 million series was used for World War II draftees and the 50 million for the Korean War and early Vietnam.  The 60 million series of the late Vietnam War was issued without restriction.

Basic Training soldiers on July 1, 1969, were required to memorize both the Service Number and the Social Security number to accommodate the changeover to using only the Social Security number.

Notable service numbers

The following service numbers have been held by some of the more famous veterans of the United States Army:

 R-1: Arthur Crean 
 O-1: John J. Pershing 
 O-2: Leonard Wood
 O-57: Douglas MacArthur
 O-668: Charles F. Humphrey
 O-2605: George S. Patton
 O-3822: Dwight Eisenhower
 O-5284: Norman Cota
 O-12043: Leslie Groves
 O-20362: William P. Yarborough
 O-143128: Archibald Roosevelt
 O-565390: Clark Gable
 O-662062: Gene Roddenberry
 073 858: Norman Schwarzkopf, Jr.
 0 357 403: Ronald Reagan
 0 765 497: Russell Johnson
 05 242 035: Homer Hickam
 2371377: Ian Wolfe
 32 325 070: Burl Ives
 32 694 076: Burt Lancaster
 32 698 169: Nehemiah Persoff
 32 726 378: Charles Durning
 32 738 306: Rod Serling
 32 980 601: Karl Malden
 33 455 116: William Windom
 35 425 274: Basil Plumley
 35 756 363: Don Knotts
 36 896 415: Eddie Slovik
 39 531 145: Elisha Cook, Jr.
 39 563 856: DeForest Kelley
 39 744 068: Robert Mitchum
 ER 11 229 770: Leonard Nimoy
 ER 11 530 137: Todd Akin
 NG 28 296 022: Brion James
 US 51 214 821: Richard Herd
 US 52 314 745: Frank Gorshin
 US 52 346 646: Robert Duvall
 US 53 310 761: Elvis Presley
 US 54 356 205: Dean Corll

According to U.S. Army records, despite efforts to avoid duplicate service numbers, there have been at least six occurrences of an Army soldier who was issued the service number "12 345 678".

See also
Service number (United States Armed Forces)

References

Sources

 National Personnel Records Center, Instruction Memo 1865.20E, "Service Number Information", 14 April 1988
 Military Personnel Records Center, "Training Guide Concerning Military Service Numbers", 28 June 2009

External links
 "WWII US Army Enlistment Records Database"
 "How to Determine Army Serial Numbers"

Military life
Identifiers
History of the United States Army